Country Cookin was a Virginia-based chain of casual dining restaurants featuring Southern cuisine with 14 locations throughout Virginia, mostly in Southwest Virginia, the Shenandoah Valley, and the U.S. 29 corridor. The first restaurant was opened by Roger Smith in Roanoke, Virginia in 1981. On October 16, 2020, the chain announced that it would be closing its remaining locations at close of business on October 18. The financial fallout of the COVID-19 pandemic was cited as a major reason for their permanent closure.

See also
 List of Southern restaurants

References

1981 establishments in Virginia
2020 disestablishments in Virginia
Restaurants established in 1981
Restaurants disestablished in 2020
Companies based in Roanoke, Virginia
Defunct restaurant chains in the United States
Regional restaurant chains in the United States
Restaurants in Virginia
Southern restaurants